Manitoba Rugby Football Union was a Canadian football league, founded on Monday February 22, 1892.  The league merged with the Alberta Rugby Football Union and Saskatchewan Rugby Football Union to form the Western Canada Rugby Football Union on Saturday October 21, 1911.

MRFU teams
 Winnipegs - 1930 to 1935
 Winnipeg Rugby Football Club - 1892 to 1906
 St.John's Rugby Football Club - 1892 to 1913 & 1919 & 1925 to 1931
 Winnipeg Rowing Club - 1902 to 1914
 Winnipeg Tammany Tigers - 1913 to 1929
 Winnipeg Victorias Rugby Club - 1919 to 1927 & 1935
 Winnipeg Shamrocks - 1903 & 1905 
 Brandon Football Club - 1906
 Wesley College Football Club - 1897 to 1898
 Royal Canadian Dragoons - 1897 to 1898
 Royal School of Infantry / 90th Regiment - 1888
 Garrison Rugby Club - 1932 to 1933
 University of Manitoba Varsity & Bisons - 1920 to 1926 & 1934
 Osborne Rugby Football Club - 1892 to 1893
 Winnipeg Canoe Club - 1915

MRFU Champions

1892 - St.John's Rugby Football Club
1893 - St.John's Rugby Football Club
1894 - Winnipeg Rugby Football Club
1895 - St.John's Rugby Football Club
1896 - St.John's Rugby Football Club
1897 - No Champion (Wesley College Football Club, St.John's Rugby Football Club and Winnipeg Rugby Football Club finished in a three-way tie)
1898 - St.John's Rugby Football Club
1899 - St.John's Rugby Football Club
1900 - Winnipeg Rugby Football Club
1901 - Winnipeg Rugby Football Club
1902 - Winnipeg Rowing Club
1903 - Winnipeg Shamrocks
1904 - Winnipeg Rowing Club
1905 - Winnipeg Rowing Club
1906 - Winnipeg Rowing Club
1907 - Winnipeg Rowing Club
1908 - St.John's Rugby Football Club
1909 - St.John's Rugby Football Club
1910 - Winnipeg Rowing Club
1911 - Winnipeg Rowing Club
1912 - Winnipeg Rowing Club
1913 - Winnipeg Rowing Club
1914 - Winnipeg Rowing Club
1915 - No League Play - Winnipeg Tigers won the only game played in 1915
1916 - World War I
1917 - World War I
1918 - World War I
1919 - Winnipeg Victorias
1920 - Winnipeg Victorias
1921 - Winnipeg Victorias
1922 - Winnipeg Victorias
1923 - Winnipeg Victorias
1924 - Winnipeg Victorias
1925 - Winnipeg Tammany Tigers
1926 - Winnipeg St.John's
1927 - Winnipeg Tammany Tigers
1928 - suspended play for Tri-City Rugby Football League 
1929 - Winnipeg St.John's
1930 - Winnipeg St.John's
1931 - Winnipeg St.John's
1932 - Winnipeg St.John's
1933 - Winnipegs
1934 - Winnipegs
1935 - Winnipegs

TOTALS
13 - St.John's Rugby Football Club
10 - Winnipeg Rowing Club
6 - Winnipeg Victorias Rugby Club
3 - Winnipegs  (Winnipeg Blue Bombers)
3 - Winnipeg Rugby Football Club
2 - Winnipeg Tammany Tigers
1 - Winnipeg Shamrocks

References

 Football Canada - CANADIAN FOOTBALL TIMELINES (1860 – PRESENT)
HISTORY OF THE WINNIPEG BLUE BOMBERS

Defunct Canadian football leagues
Defunct rugby union leagues in Canada
Sports leagues established in 1888
1888 establishments in Manitoba
Sports leagues disestablished in 1911
1911 disestablishments in Manitoba